George Patton, Lord Glenalmond,  (1803 – 20 September 1869) was a Scottish politician and judge.

Life
He studied law at the University of Edinburgh. He studied at University of Glasgow and Trinity College, Cambridge. He was Conservative Member of Parliament for Bridgwater, Somerset from 1865 to 1866.  He was appointed Solicitor-General for Scotland in 1859 and Lord Advocate in 1866, and appointed himself to the bench as Lord Justice Clerk in 1867 with the judicial title Lord Glenalmond, partly to avoid inquiry into charges of bribery in connection with his election to Parliament. He committed suicide in September 1869.

Glenalmond College
The school now known as Glenalmond College was built on land given by George Patton who for the rest of his life, in company with his wife, took a keen interest in its development and success.

Family
On 25 March 1857 in Edinburgh, he married Margaret Bethune (1823-1899). She was the younger daughter of Lieutenant-General Alexander Bethune of Blebo (1771-1847), son of Major-General Sir William Sharp, 6th Baronet and Margaret Bethune, and his wife Maria Low (1794-1886), daughter of Robert James Low of Clatto and his wife Susanna Elizabeth Malcolm.

There were no children. His widow continued to run the Glenalmond estate for the rest of her life and on 2 January 1871 in Edinburgh married Robert Malcolm.

References

External links 
 

1803 births
1869 deaths
Alumni of the University of Edinburgh
Alumni of the University of Glasgow
Alumni of Trinity College, Cambridge
British politicians who committed suicide
Conservative Party (UK) MPs for English constituencies
Lord Advocates
Glenalmond
UK MPs 1865–1868
Solicitors General for Scotland
Members of the Privy Council of the United Kingdom
1860s suicides